The NGC 4038 Group is a group of galaxies in the constellations Corvus and Crater.  The group may contain between 13 and 27 galaxies.  The group's best known galaxies are the Antennae Galaxies (NGC 4038/NGC4039), a well-known interacting pair of galaxies.

Members

The table below lists galaxies that have been consistently identified as group members in the Nearby Galaxies Catalog, the survey of Fouque et al., the Lyons Groups of Galaxies (LGG) Catalog, and the three group lists created from the Nearby Optical Galaxy sample of Giuricin et al.

Additionally, the references above frequently but inconsistently identify PGC 37513, PGC 37565, and UGCA 270 as members of this group.  Based on the above references, the exact membership of this group is somewhat uncertain as is the exact number of galaxies within the group.

Location
The NGC 4038 group along with other galaxies and galaxy groups are part of the Crater Cloud which is a component of the Virgo Supercluster.

See also

 M96 Group - a similar group of galaxies

References

 
Galaxy clusters
Corvus (constellation)
Crater (constellation)
Virgo Supercluster